Gibson Nyandoro (1954 or 1955–2008) was a Zimbabwean war veteran and political dissident who died in military custody in Zimbabwe in May 2008.

Originally a supporter of Robert Mugabe's Zanu-PF, and a participant in the war for independence, he took part in the seizing of White-owned farms.

A few days before the March 2008 elections, he took part in a pro-Opposition rally. He was arrested on May 2 in Epworth, near Harare, and reportedly tortured to death in army barracks.

References

1950s births
Assassinated dissidents
2008 deaths
Zimbabwean people who died in prison custody
Prisoners who died in Zimbabwean detention
Extrajudicial killings in Zimbabwe
Zimbabwean murder victims
Zimbabwean torture victims